The Day of My Wedding, is a 2007 Botswana drama short film directed by Thato Rantao Mwosa and produced by Thato Rantao Mwosa as SaBantu Productions. The film stars Erickka Jones in lead role along with Souleymane Sy Savane and Audrey Aduama in supportive roles.

The film has been shot in and around Boston, Massachusetts, USA. The film received critical acclaim and won several awards at international film festivals. The film had its premier at Roxbury Film Festival, USA on 4 August 2007.

Cast
 Erickka Jones as Lulu 
 Souleymane Sy Savane as Tim
 Audrey Aduama as Lulu's Mama

References

External links
 

2007 films
2007 drama films
2007 short films
Botswana films
2000s English-language films